This Spartan Life is a talk show created by Bong + Dern Productions and produced and directed by Chris Burke, who hosts the show under the pseudonym Damian Lacedaemion . Premiering in 2005 and distributed over the Internet, the show is created using the machinima technique of recording the video and audio from a multiplayer Xbox Live session of Bungie' first-person shooter video game Halo 2. The half-hour episodes are released in six smaller parts, called modules. Guests, such as Bungie's audio director Martin O'Donnell are interviewed via Xbox Live within the online multiplayer worlds of Halo 2, and most recently Halo 3.

In addition to regular shows, special content has been created for Spiketv.com and the 2006 Machinima Festival. A premium edition of Halo 3 includes exclusive This Spartan Life content.

Most recently, This Spartan Life has been distributed on Xbox Live's central hub for Halo, Halo Waypoint. The new episodes on Halo Waypoint include interviews with members of the band OK Go and an interview with Ultima Online creator Richard Garriott.

Episode format
This Spartan Life consists of episodes separated into five or six modules of varying lengths. These modules are the core of the show; they vary from episode to episode. However, there are some common threads. Every show starts with a talk-show standard, the monologue, during which Damian lays out the show ahead, as well as a small comedy bit. This is the only "stable" segment of the show, besides the Solid Gold Elite Dancers, as it has appeared in every episode. The Solid Gold Elite Dancers segment is a dance segment (usually), set to music by Glomag, the pseudonym of the creator Chris Burke, and in Episode Three was a full-fledged music video. The segment "Body Count", which appeared in the first two episodes, is a debate between two contestants who make their points while fighting each other. The Travelogue segment is a glitch montage, which is set to music, and is one of the most popular segments, as the show's original fans were glitchers. The rest of the segment are usually the interviews, with the guest of the show.

Characters
This Spartan Life has a full cast of characters, each with their own unique qualities, which serve to move the show along. As is typical in machinima, the characters have very strong personalities and are heavily characterized in order to make up for the weakness of machinima: the inability to act. The host, Damian Lacedaemion, is a personable soldier in grey with a smiley face emblem adorning his armor. He leads the show with his carefree manner, and when his guests come under fire, he often has to fall back on his soldiering skills to save them. He tries to rise to a "higher level of discourse" and is the center of the civil nature of the show. Damian has a shotgun, named Phil, which can talk, and prefers to be used exclusively by Damian and will fight anyone attempting to use him without authorization. The show's DJ, DJ Octobit, is named in a reference to the 8-bit music he plays in the show. He creates the music for the show on his DJ console, which looks like a strange round pedestal. He never speaks, yet he has defended Damian on several occasions.  In the first episode he is referred to as Doctor Octobit, but later his name was changed to DJ Octobit. The show featured a co-host under the tag of d4rk5had0w other-wise known as K. He played a small role in the mini-series as a stand-up comedy Spartan but later left the show. The show also features the Solid Gold Elite Dancers (a reference to the 1980s television series Solid Gold). They usually dance to music by Glomag, the alias of Chris Burke, and a segment in the show is reserved for them.

History
However, before episode one was released the name was changed to This Spartan Life, and all releases have been under that name. The show, while fairly popular, saw a spike in popularity with the release of its fifth blog, which centered on network neutrality. That episode became widespread and was shown to the United States Congress. This Spartan Life experienced a surge in media attention, as shown by This Spartan Lifes press page. In October 2009, episode 6 was released after a long hiatus. this was explained in-show that they were 'working out kinks'.

Production
The guests are either interviewed on Xbox Live, or in Bong + Dern's sound booth.  Most shows are made, at least in part, on Xbox Live; however, not all of the show segments can be filmed exclusively on Xbox Live, due to issues of in-game latency ("lag"), which would otherwise prevent the coordination seen in the Solid Gold Elite Dancers. The cameras are created using the "gun-drop glitch", which causes them to lose their weapons, thus providing a less obstructed screen. The guests for the show are usually interviewed in Bong + Dern's sound booth. As of the most recent release of media (Episode 5, Module 4) the cast has moved to Halo 3, utilizing the Saved Film feature for capturing.

This Spartan Life straddles the real and virtual world. It is filmed in and intentionally incorporates the unpredictability of the open environment of Xbox Live. During a filming session, others engage earnestly in a multiplayer game in the same area, and may sometimes attack the host or his interviewee. Occasionally, Burke and his guest devolve into firing at each other's avatars.

Episodes

The Original Series
The original series of This Spartan Life consists of 7 episodes.

Blogs
In July 2005 This Spartan Life began a blog series focused on the virtual production.

Halo Waypoint
In 2010, 343 Industries asked This Spartan Life to make 8 episodes for the Halo Waypoint Channel on Xbox Live. A total of 10 episodes would be released. These episodes ran from April 2010 until May 2011.

Selfies in the War Zone
Selfies in the War Zone is a short lived side series to TSL.

Reception
This Spartan Life has been mentioned by Attack of the Show!, Electronic Gaming Monthly,  Wired Magazine, and Google Current. The show won an award for Best Machinima Series at the 2005 Machinima Film Festival and 2008 Machinima Film Festival. and was nominated for the same award in 2006, but did not win. The show was featured at Festival Nemo in France. Special videos have been created for Spiketv.com and the 2006 Machinima Festival. The show has gathered a large online community of both new media advocates and gamers.

References

External links
Official site
Official site (archived)

Machinima based on Halo (franchise)